Loveland Park is a census-designated place (CDP) located in Symmes Township, Hamilton County and Deerfield Township, Warren County, in the southwestern part of the U.S. state of Ohio. The CDP is named after the city of Loveland. The population was 1,737 at the 2020 census.

Geography
Loveland Park is located at  (39.296383, -84.262551).

Demographics

At the 2000 census there were 1,799 people, 658 households, and 513 families living in the CDP. The population density was 1,221.1 people per square mile (472.5/km2). There were 687 housing units at an average density of 466.3/sq mi (180.4/km2).  The racial makeup of the CDP was 96.55% White, 0.89% African American, 0.28% Native American, 1.28% Asian, 0.50% from other races, and 0.50% from two or more races. Hispanic or Latino of any race were 0.78%.

Of the 658 households 36.9% had children under the age of 18 living with them, 67.2% were married couples living together, 7.8% had a female householder with no husband present, and 22.0% were non-families. 18.2% of households were one person and 7.3% were one person aged 65 or older. The average household size was 2.73 and the average family size was 3.11.

The age distribution was 26.1% under the age of 18, 5.9% from 18 to 24, 32.9% from 25 to 44, 22.8% from 45 to 64, and 12.3% 65 or older. The median age was 38 years. For every 100 females there were 101.7 males. For every 100 females age 18 and over, there were 98.8 males.

The median household income was $45,227 and the median family income  was $50,536. Males had a median income of $39,148 versus $30,306 for females. The per capita income for the CDP was $24,546. About 1.3% of families and 1.8% of the population were below the poverty line, including 2.7% of those under age 18 and 4.3% of those age 65 or over.

References

Census-designated places in Warren County, Ohio
Census-designated places in Hamilton County, Ohio